Beaches—East York (formerly Beaches—Woodbine) is a federal electoral district in Toronto, Ontario, Canada, that has been represented in the House of Commons of Canada since 1988. This riding is situated east of Toronto's downtown.   

According to the 2016 Census, Beaches—East York has a population of 109,468 and is known for its ethnic diversity. It has the highest percentage of people of English (24.2%), Canadian (19.7%), and Scottish (18.9%) ethnic origins of all ridings in the City of Toronto.

Since 2015, two-term Liberal MP Nathaniel Erskine-Smith has represented Beaches—East York. At the 2019 federal elections, Erskine-Smith secured the largest margin of victory (20,204 votes) and the all-time largest share of the vote (57.2%) in Beaches—East York.  

This riding has been historically represented by the political left, with Maria Minna (Liberal) being its longest representative to date, holding the office for six terms.

Geography

Beaches—East York is bordered by Coxwell Avenue to the west, the Don River and Sunrise Avenue to the north, Victoria Park Avenue to the east, and Lake Ontario to the south. The riding contains the neighbourhoods of the Beaches, Upper Beaches, East Danforth, O'Connor–Parkview, and part of Old East York.

History
The federal riding of Beaches—Woodbine was created before the 1988 federal election from Beaches riding. Before the 1997 federal election, it adopted its current name. 

The original boundary of the riding of Beaches-Woodbine began where the southern extension of Leslie Street intersects with Lake Ontario, proceeds north along Leslie Street, then east along Queen Street East, north along Greenwood Avenue, east along Gerrard Street East, and north along Coxwell Avenue until it turns into Coxwell Blvd. at O'Connor Drive. 

It continues a short distance along this street where the boundary extends until it meets Taylor-Massey Creek. It follows the creek west (downstream) until it meets the Don River East Branch. The boundary follows the river northeast (upstream) until it meets the point where a westerly extension of Sunrise Avenue intersects with the river course. 

The boundary continues east along Sunrise Avenue until it meets Victoria Park Avenue. The boundary turns south and follows the street south until it ends at Lake Ontario. The boundary follows the lake coast back west until it meets the beginning point.

In 2003, the western boundary was altered so that the portion west of Coxwell Avenue was transferred to the neighbouring riding of Toronto-Danforth. This riding was unchanged after the 2012 electoral redistribution.

Members of Parliament
Since its creation as Beaches-Woodbine in 1988, Beaches—East York has been contested between Liberal and New Democratic candidates, with both parties nearly doubling Conservative vote totals.

Pre-2011 
Hon. Maria Minna represented Beaches-East York for a record 18 straight years, as a member of Prime Minister Jean Chrétien's and Prime Minister Paul Martin’s governments, and as a member of Her Majesty’s Loyal Opposition under Liberal Leaders Stéphane Dion and Michael Ignatieff.

2011 General Election 
In the 2011 election the riding was won by New Democratic Party candidate Matthew Kellway, beating out Liberal incumbent Maria Minna by nearly 11%.

2015 General Election 
Nathaniel Erskine-Smith defeated Matthew Kellway in the 2015 election by 10,345 votes. 2015 was Nathaniel Erskine-Smith’s first federal election.

2019 General Election 
The incumbent MP Nathaniel Erskine-Smith was re-elected with 32,168 votes. Mae J Nam was acclaimed as the NDP candidate on May 28, 2019 and was the runner-up, receiving 12,196 votes. 

Beaches—East York has elected the following Members of Parliament:

Demographics 
According to the Canada 2021 Census

Ethnic groups: 61.4% White, 11.3% South Asian, 7.6% Black, 5.2% Chinese, 3.3% Filipino, 2.5% Indigenous, 2.1% Latin American, 1.2% West Asian

Languages: 67.9% English, 2.8% Bengali, 2.2% Cantonese, 1.8% French, 1.7% Greek, 1.6% Spanish, 1.4% Tagalog, 1.2% Urdu, 1.0% Italian

Religions: 43.3% Christian (20.0% Catholic, 5.3% Christian Orthodox, 4.1% Anglican, 2.7% United Church, 11.2% Other), 9.1% Muslim, 2.8% Hindu, 1.7% Jewish, 1.1% Buddhist, 40.6% None

Median income: $44,000 (2020)

Average income: $69,500 (2020)

Election results

Beaches—East York

Beaches—Woodbine

See also
 List of Canadian federal electoral districts
 Past Canadian electoral districts

References

Notes

Federal riding history for Beaches—Woodbine from the Library of Parliament
Federal riding history for Beaches—East York from the Library of Parliament
Expenditures

Citations

Federal electoral districts of Toronto
Ontario federal electoral districts
1987 establishments in Ontario